This is a list of air bases of the Pakistan Air Force. There are a total of 40 air bases, which are classified into two categories: flying bases and non-flying bases. Flying bases are operational bases from which aircraft operate during peacetime and wartime; whereas non-flying bases conduct either training, administration, maintenance, or mission support.

Flying Bases

Non-flying bases

See also
 air base
 List of countries with overseas military bases

References

External links
Air Bases of PAF at fas.org
PAF Falcons - Battle Lines of the PAF

Pakistan
Bases
Air Force Bases